Ang Luha at Lualhati ni Jeronima (The Sorrow and Happiness of Jeronima) is a 2018 Philippine short film by CJ Santos and inspired by the third chapter of Dr. Jose Rizal's El Filibusterismo. It is one of the finalists for the 2018 Wisik Short Film Competition by the National Commission for Culture and the Arts. In December 2018, the film had official selection in In-Short 2018 Film Festival in Lagos, Nigeria.

It follows the old tale of a young woman named Jeronima who was promised marriage by her lover but a twist of fate brought her to the deepest corners of the Pasig River where she met a farmer named Ignacio.

Plot 
Tristan is a 5th grader taking photos of the present-day Pasig River where he meets Mang Igme, a mysterious street sweeper who asks him to keep the park clean.

Mang Igme shares the old tale of Jeronima, a young woman living in the old Pasig River and was promised a marriage by her lover Antonio, upon his return from his studies. She waited for him for years and one day, learned that her old sweetheart becomes the town's parish priest.

In fear of tarnishing his reputation, Father Antonio casts Jeronima to the farther side of the river where she met a farmer named Ignacio. Jeronima became friends with Ignacio and they shared love and happiness together.

Cast

Karen Gutierrez	- Jeronima
Ardi Aquino	- Ignacio
Tristan Jota	- Tristan
Jamieson Lee	- Mang Igme
Aljo Sanchez	- Antonio
 CJ Santos	- Pepe

Development 

Upon the announcement of the National Commission for Culture and the Arts, CJ Santos talked to Rem Ermita and Ritchie Jota in Quezon City and wrote the draft of the script in 30-minutes. The group then launched a crowdsourcing page on Go Get Funding to raise a P90,000 peso budget.

Accolades 

After competing for the National Commission for Culture and the Arts, the film has been screened and ran in competition in different international film festivals.

References

External links 
 Official Trailer
 

2018 short films
Philippine short films
2010s Tagalog-language films
Philippine New Wave
Films shot in Rizal